A Southern Maid is a 1933 British musical film directed by Harry Hughes and starring Bebe Daniels, Clifford Mollison and Hal Gordon. It is based on the operetta A Southern Maid by Harold Fraser-Simson. A young Spanish woman marries a lowly Englishman, rather than the aristocrat her father had intended, much to his displeasure. It was part of the cycle of operetta films popular in Britain in the mid-1930s.

Cast
 Bebe Daniels as  Juanita / Dolores
 Clifford Mollison as Jack Rawden / Willoughby
Nancy Brown as Carola
 Hal Gordon as Pedro
 Morris Harvey as Vasco
 Lupino Lane as Antonio Lopez
 Basil Radford as Tom
 Amy Veness as Donna Rosa
 Harry Welchman as Francisco del Fuego

References

External links
 

1933 films
British musical films
1933 musical films
Films shot at British International Pictures Studios
Films directed by Harry Hughes
Operetta films
Films based on operettas
British black-and-white films
1930s English-language films
1930s British films